The Madison Radicals are a semi-professional ultimate team that competes in the Central Division of the American Ultimate Disc League. The Radicals play their home games at Breese Stevens Field in downtown Madison. Since the team's inception in 2013, they have won five regular season divisional titles in eight seasons. After losing in the AUDL championship games in 2013 and 2015, the Radicals claimed its first championship in 2018. Madison also hosted AUDL Championship Weekends in 2016 and 2018, the latter of which coincided with a championship win.

History

2012 
In summer of 2012, it was reported that Madison would be home to an American Ultimate Disc League team, the Radicals. Slated to join the AUDL for its second season in 2013, effort organizer Tim DeByl stated that he hoped to get Breese Stevens Field as a venue for the team's home games.

2013 
The Radicals hosted their first tryout in January 2013. Over 60 players attended the combine, with the tryout reaching into the middle of the night.

After winning their first-ever game against the Chicago Wildfire, the Radicals parlayed defensive success all the way to the AUDL championship game, losing to the Toronto Rush.

2014 
The Radicals were again successful in their second year of play, going undefeated at home during the regular season. Peter Graffy set the AUDL single-season blocks record with 49. The Radicals beat the Indianapolis AlleyCats 25–16 in the Midwest Division championship game to advance to their second straight AUDL Championship Weekend appearance. After leading early in the AUDL semi-finals, Madison ended up losing to the eventual champion San Jose 23–20.

2015 
Madison once again went undefeated at home on their way to a 13–1 regular season record. San Jose eliminated Madison for the second straight year, this time in the AUDL championship game.

2016 
The Radicals went undefeated in regular-season play, only the third such season in league history. The team set a regular season attendance record at the time with over 1200 fans coming out on June 4 to watch the AUDL Game of the Week. A close loss to the Seattle Cascades during Championship Weekend, which was held at Breese Stevens, snapped a years-long home winning streak for Madison.

2017 
The Radicals would claim their fourth consecutive regular season Midwest Division title in 2017, and advanced to the AUDL semi-finals, where they were bounced by eventual champion San Francisco in the semi-finals.

2018 
The Radicals won another Midwest Division title in 2018. Robyn Fennig (Wiseman) became the first female player in team history. Madison played host to AUDL Championship Weekend for the second time in three seasons. This time, the Radicals went all the way, beating the Los Angeles Aviators 24–19 in the semi-finals before taking down the Dallas Roughnecks 20–16 in the 2018 AUDL championship game.

2019 
In their third game of the 2019 season, the Radicals lost at home to the Minnesota Wind Chill, their first home loss in 2,190 days. The Radicals eventually missed the playoffs for the first time in franchise history, finishing 6–6 on the season.

2020 
The 2020 AUDL Season was cancelled due to the COVID-19 pandemic

2021 
The Radicals missed the playoffs for the second straight year, finishing 7-5.

2022 
The Radicals became the first AUDL team to surpass 100 wins after beating the Pittsburgh Thunderbirds 18-16 on May 7.

Season-by-season results

Venue 
The Radicals have played every home game at Breese Stevens Field, located in downtown Madison, Wisconsin.

References

External links

Ultimate (sport) teams
Sports in Madison, Wisconsin
2013 establishments in Wisconsin
Ultimate teams established in 2013